Christopher Nicholas Roald Logsdail OBE (born June 1945) is a British art dealer, the owner of the Lisson Gallery, a contemporary art gallery on Bell Street, Lisson Grove, London, founded by Logsdail in 1967, and was joined shortly after by Fiona McLean.

Early life and education
Logsdail was born in 1945, the son of John Logsdail and Else Kirsten Dahl, sister of the author Roald Dahl. It was his uncle who introduced him to art.

Logsdail was educated at Bryanston School and the Slade School of Fine Art.

Recognition
Logsdail was interviewed by Sarah Thornton at Art Basel for Seven Days in the Art World. In 2014, The Guardian named him in their "Movers and makers: the most powerful people in the art world".

In 2002, Logsdail purchased Utulivu, an 18th-century residence in Lamu, which he renovated in the traditional style of Gujarati craftsmen. By 2006, he acquired the town’s derelict palm-oil factory and turned it into an artists’ retreat.

Logsdail was appointed Officer of the Order of the British Empire (OBE) in the 2017 New Year Honours for services to the arts.

Personal life
Logsdail has three sons and a daughter from two marriages. His son Alex is also an art dealer.

References

Living people
Art dealers from London
1945 births
Place of birth missing (living people)
People educated at Bryanston School
Alumni of the Slade School of Fine Art
Officers of the Order of the British Empire
Dahl family
British people of Norwegian descent